J. J. O'Kelly may refer to:
 James Joseph O'Kelly (1845–1916) Irish nationalist MP and journalist
 John J. O'Kelly (1872–1957), "Sceilg", Irish language writer and republican

See also
O'Kelly (surname)